The JRU Heavy Bombers basketball program represents José Rizal University (JRU) in men's basketball as a member of the National Collegiate Athletic Association (Philippines) (NCAA). The JRU Heavy Bombers are the varsity teams with the longest continuous membership in the NCAA, having been a member since 1927 without interruption, and have the longest championship drought.

History 
Prior to the Commission on Higher Education granting it university status in 2000, the school was known as José Rizal College (JRC).

JRC won the 1963 and 1964 NCAA titles via the exploits of Rene Canent and Egay Gomez; the former would later be the first president of the Philippine Basketball Association Players Association.  The Bombers had another back-to-back title romp in 1967 and 1968 led by 1967 Most Valuable Player Rhoel Deles, Carlos Villamayor and Sixto Agbay. 

Their last title was in 1972, when they were led by Philip Cezar, his brother David and Jimmy Santos. Its entire starting line-up was later drafted in the Philippine Basketball Association. Francisco Calilan coached the Bombers in these five championships, and for 31 seasons from 1958 to 1989.

Starting in 1987, Vergel Meneses led the Heavy Bombers, but would not able to lead them to the championship. 

In 1999, JRC was defeated by the Letran Knights in a violence-marred title series. Two years later, now known as JRU, the Bombers lost to the San Sebastian Stags in the Finals. They would next make it to the Finals in 2008 led by John Wilson, but were defeated by the San Beda Red Lions. Coached by Ariel Vanguardia at this time, he coached JRU to three consecutive playoff appearances from 2007 to 2009, after which he resigned. Meneses would then coach the team from 2009 to 2018.

In Meneses' first season, they lost to the San Sebastian Stags in the semifinals, but had Wilson named as the MVP. Meneses further led the Bombers to semifinals finishes in 2010, 2011, 2014 and 2015.

After finishing last place in 2018, and in order to run as mayor of him hometown in Bulakan, Bulacan, Meneses was replaced by former De La Salle coach Louie Gonzalez.

Current roster
NCAA Season 98

Head coaches 
 1958–1989: Francisco Calilan
 Until 2003: Boy de Vera
 2004–2005: Cris Calilan
 2006–2009: Ariel Vanguardia
 2010–2018: Vergel Meneses
 2019–present: Louie Gonzalez

Season-by-season records

References 

National Collegiate Athletic Association (Philippines) basketball teams